Gilaneh may refer to:
 Gilaneh, Ilam
 Gilaneh, Kermanshah
 Gilaneh, Kurdistan
Gilaneh (film)